Ernest Draper Stewart (July 28, 1909 – November 15, 2001) was an American professional baseball umpire who worked in the American League from 1941 to 1945. Stewart umpired 687 regular season Major League Baseball (MLB) games in his 5-year career. He also umpired in the 1942 All-Star Game.

On July 17, 1941, Stewart was umpiring at third base when Ken Keltner made two sharp defensive plays to help end Joe DiMaggio's 56-game hitting streak.

See also

 List of Major League Baseball umpires

References

External links

Ernie Stewart Oral History Interview (1 of 5) - National Baseball Hall of Fame Digital Collection
Ernie Stewart Oral History Interview (2 of 5) - National Baseball Hall of Fame Digital Collection
Ernie Stewart Oral History Interview (3 of 5) - National Baseball Hall of Fame Digital Collection
Ernie Stewart Oral History Interview (4 of 5) - National Baseball Hall of Fame Digital Collection
Ernie Stewart Oral History Interview (5 of 5) - National Baseball Hall of Fame Digital Collection

1909 births
2001 deaths
Major League Baseball umpires
Sportspeople from Texas
People from Edwards County, Texas